Hoya valmayoriana is an endemic species of porcelainflower or wax plant found in the Philippines, an Asclepiad species of flowering plant in the dogbane family Apocynaceae described in 2012 by Kloppenburg, et al.. Hoya valmayoriana belongs to the genus Hoya. The species corolla in its flower is peach-colored. Originally, this species together with 7 other hoyas, were collected in October 1988 by David M. Cummings(collection number DMC 1622), ¾ kilometer North of Lake Bulusan, in a dense forest along the roadside. The distance of which is from the junction of the main road going along the road towards Lake Bulusan, Sorsogon Province, Philippines - the same location as Hoya davidcummingii Kloppenburg (1995). Mr. Cummings emailed the first author in May 2012 to confirm.

Etymology
The specific epithet in the scientific name, valmayoriana named in honor of Dr. Helen Valmayor, a retired
professor of the Department of Horticulture, University of the Philippines Los Baños, Laguna, Philippines.

References

valmayoriana
Endemic flora of the Philippines
valmayoriana